Melanie Hall (20 August 1970 – disappeared 9 June 1996; declared legally dead 17 November 2004) was a British hospital clerical officer from Bradford on Avon, who disappeared on 9 June 1996, following a night out at Cadillacs nightclub in Bath. It was not until 5 October 2009 that her partial remains were discovered, after a plastic bin bag containing human bones was found by a workman on the M5 motorway near Thornbury, South Gloucestershire. The bones, which included a pelvis, thigh bone and skull, were analysed and identified as belonging to Melanie Hall on 7 October 2009. It was determined that Hall had suffered severe fractures to her skull and face, and had been tied up with rope, although a definitive cause of death could not be established. Over the years, various people have been arrested, but subsequently released.

Background
Hall was described by her parents as a "young, vibrant daughter". She had graduated from the University of Bath in 1995 with a degree in nursing; Hall's mother, Pat Hall, said graduation had been a "cherished" dream of Melanie's for four years. Melanie Hall worked as a clerical officer at Bath's Royal United Hospital. Her father, Stephen Hall, has served Bath City Football Club as Chairman.

Disappearance

Hall had arranged to stay with her boyfriend Philip Karlbaum on 8 June and her mother dropped her off at his home. On the night of 8 June 1996 Hall went to Cadillacs nightclub in Bath with Karlbaum and another couple. Hall was reported as having had an argument with Karlbaum, and he left the club "upset" after he allegedly saw her dancing with another man. Hall was last seen sitting on a stool in the club at around 1:10 am on 9 June 1996. She was reported missing on 11 June 1996 by her parents after she failed to turn up for work.

Karlbaum described his devastation at her disappearance on 17 June 1996. Avon and Somerset police launched several searches of the River Avon after her disappearance and interviewed thousands of clubbers and taxi drivers. A £10,000 reward was offered for information, and the BBC show Crimewatch and Crimestoppers both made appeals to the public for information, as did Hall's sister Dominique, but no trace of Hall was found.

Hall was declared legally dead on 17 November 2004.

Discovery of remains
On 5 October 2009, a motorway worker found a plastic bin bag containing bones while he was clearing a vegetation patch on a slip road at Junction 14 of the M5 motorway. The bones in the bag included a skull, pelvis and thigh bone and further remains were found buried and spread around the field by the side of the motorway. Police confirmed that the remains were human, and they showed a piece of jewellery found at the site to Hall's parents, who confirmed that it had belonged to their daughter. Despite this, police refused to confirm that the body was that of Hall until a post-mortem had been carried out. The remains were formally identified as being Hall's through dental records on 7 October. She had incurred severe blunt trauma to her head resulting in a fractured skull, cheekbone and jaw. Hall had also been tied up with a blue rope.

Hall's parents launched a fresh appeal on 8 October for anyone with information to come forward, while Avon and Somerset CID DS Mike Britton stated that he was staying on after his retirement to continue working on the Hall disappearance, codenamed Operation Denmark, having spent 13 years on the case. On 29 October 2009, police announced that three keys to a Ford vehicle, possibly a Transit, Fiesta or Escort, had been found near the body, and that they were working with Ford to try to identify the vehicle. Crimewatch also launched a fresh appeal for information, which resulted in more than 200 phone calls from the public. The reward for information leading to arrest was also increased to £20,000.

In October 2019, police revealed they had obtained a partial DNA profile from the rope wrapped around the bag containing Hall's remains and stated that they remained confident that Hall's killer would be caught. Her parents reinstated a £50,000 reward for information leading to an arrest and conviction.

Arrests

In 1998, the suspected killer of Suzy Lamplugh, John Cannan, was questioned over the murder. Known for his Bristol connections, Cannan was spoken to by police after allegations came to light that he had plotted the murder of Hall from his prison cell at HM Prison Durham. Detectives investigated claims from sources that said that Cannan had spent many hours planning what he described as the "perfect" abduction with a fellow inmate. The other inmate was a convicted rapist who supposedly put the plan into action after being released from prison. Inexplicably, although Cannan was in prison at the time of Hall's abduction and murder, some witnesses came forward to say they were certain that Cannan was the man they had seen abducting Hall that night. Hall's parents said that they feared if Cannan was responsible for their daughter's death they would never know the truth of what happened to her, as Cannan was infamous for tactically withholding information about victims in order to maintain a sense of control over investigators.

In 2003, police arrested two men in connection with Hall's disappearance but they were released without charge after police searched buildings and a field near Bath. In 2009, a 37-year-old man confessed his involvement in Hall's murder to police in Greater Manchester, but was eliminated from the inquiry after undergoing psychiatric tests. In July 2010, a 38-year-old man from Bath was arrested on suspicion of Hall's murder and subsequently released on bail. In August 2010, a 39-year-old man from Wiltshire was arrested by police on suspicion of murder after handing himself in at a police station in the Avon and Somerset area. The man was subsequently released on bail.

In October 2013, police said that they had found a white Volkswagen Golf car connected to their inquiries, and had received relevant information about the rope used to tie up Hall's body. On 25 November 2013, it was reported that a 44-year-old man had been arrested at an address in Bath, on suspicion of murder. The man was released on bail until 19 December, and a property at Roundhill Park, Whiteway, was searched. On 28 November 2014 it was reported that there was insufficient evidence to charge the suspect. On 23 June 2016, a 45-year-old man was arrested following retrieval of DNA from where Hall's remains were discovered, and released on bail a few days later.

By October 2019, eleven arrests had been made during the police investigation but no one has ever been charged.

Links to other cases
Police have yet to rule out the suggested links to John Cannan and the murder of estate agent Suzy Lamplugh (who disappeared in July 1986 and whose body has never been found). They have also not ruled out links to the case of a serial sex attacker in Bath, nicknamed the "Batman rapist" after he left a baseball cap bearing a Batman logo at the scene of one attack. The unknown assailant is known to have attempted to carjack a woman at knifepoint, leaving her wounded when she fought back and managed to escape, in the same area of the city a few hours before Hall was abducted. It has also been suggested that there may be a link between Hall's murder and Levi Bellfield, who is serving life imprisonment with a whole life order for three murders committed between 2002 and 2004. A suggested link with convicted killer Christoper Halliwell, who is serving a life sentence with a whole life order for the murders of Sian O'Callaghan and Becky Godden-Edwards, has been ruled out by Avon and Somerset Police.

See also
List of solved missing person cases
List of unsolved murders in the United Kingdom
Murder of Marie Wilks – case in which a woman was found dead by the nearby M50 motorway in 1988
Disappearance of Suzy Lamplugh – woman believed to have been killed by John Cannan who has been linked to Hall's murder
Murder of Lindsay Rimer – unsolved 1994 case of a British girl who disappeared and was found a year later in a nearby canal

Other UK unsolved murders where there is DNA evidence: 
Murder of Deborah Linsley
Murders of Eve Stratford and Lynne Weedon
Murders of Jacqueline Ansell-Lamb and Barbara Mayo
Murder of Lyn Bryant
Murder of Janet Brown
Murder of Linda Cook

References

Bibliography

External links
Timeline: Melanie Hall disappearance from BBC News

1990s missing person cases
1996 in England
1996 murders in the United Kingdom
2009 in England
Crime in Gloucestershire
Crime in Somerset
Deaths by person in England
Female murder victims
Formerly missing people
June 1996 crimes
June 1996 events in the United Kingdom
Missing person cases in England
Unsolved murders in England
Violence against women in England